Roger Lemelin,  (April 7, 1919 – March 16, 1992) was a Quebec novelist, television writer and essayist.

Biography
Lemelin was born in Quebec City. From 1944 to 1952, he was a Canadian correspondent for the American magazines Time and Life and, from 1972 to 1981, chief executive officer and editor of La Presse.

In 1980 he was made a Companion of the Order of Canada. In 1989, he was made an Officer of the National Order of Quebec.

Honours and awards
Prix David (1944)
Prize from the Académie française (1944)
Guggenheim Fellowship
Fellowship in the Royal Society of Canada
Honorary doctorate from Laurentian University
Chevalier de la Légion d'honneur
Canadian corresponding membership in the Académie Goncourt
Honorary membership in the Union des écrivains québécois.

Works
 Au pied de la pente douce (The Town Below), 1947
 Les Plouffe (The Plouffe Family), 1948
 Fantaisies sur les péchés capitaux, 1949
 Pierre le magnifique (In Quest of Splendour), 1952
 The Bird Fancier (L'Homme aux oiseaux), 1952
 Les Voies de l'espérance, 1979
 La Culotte en or, 1980
 Le Crime d'Ovide Plouffe, 1982
 Autopsie d'un fumeur, 1988

References
"Roger Lemelin" in Canadian Writers, an examination of archival manuscripts, typescripts, correspondence, journals and notebooks at Library and Archives Canada

External links
 Roger Lemelin's entry in The Canadian Encyclopedia
  Archives of Roger Lemelin (Fonds Roger Lemelin, R11859) are held at Library and Archives Canada

1919 births
1992 deaths
Canadian male novelists
Officers of the National Order of Quebec
Companions of the Order of Canada
Writers from Quebec City
Best Screenplay Genie and Canadian Screen Award winners
Canadian screenwriters in French
Canadian television writers
20th-century Canadian novelists
Canadian novelists in French
Canadian male screenwriters
20th-century Canadian male writers
20th-century Canadian screenwriters
Canadian male television writers